The Federal Cartel Office (BKartA) is Germany's national competition regulatory agency. First established in 1958, BKartA comes under the authority of the Federal Ministry for Economic Affairs and Climate Action. The agency is headquartered in Bonn, the former capital of West Germany. Since 2009, Andreas Mundt has served as the president of BKartA.

References

External links

  
  

Consumer organisations in Germany
German federal agencies
Competition regulators
Federal authorities in Bonn
Regulation in Germany